Parker Lee McDonald (May 23, 1924 – June 24, 2017) was a justice of the Florida Supreme Court.

He was a judge from the U.S. state of Florida. McDonald served as a Florida Supreme Court justice from 1979 to 1994, and was chief justice from 1986 to 1988.

McDonald graduated from the University of Florida with his bachelor's degree in business administration, where he was a member of the Chi Phi fraternity. He received his law degree from the University of Florida as well. McDonald died on June 24, 2017, at his home in Tallahassee, Florida.

References

External links
Justice McDonald info
Info about Justice McDonald

1924 births
2017 deaths
Chief Justices of the Florida Supreme Court
People from Sebring, Florida
Warrington College of Business alumni
Justices of the Florida Supreme Court
Fredric G. Levin College of Law alumni
20th-century American judges
People from Tallahassee, Florida